The Army Office in Cologne was one of the two command pillars of the German Army, alongside the Army Forces Command (Heeresführungskommando, HFüKdo), until both were merged to create the current Army Command (Kommand Heer, KdoHeer). This disbandment and merging was done according to the new direction of the Bundeswehr, and the 2011 Basing Concept (Stationierungskonzept 2011).

At the time of its merger, the Army Office was made up 1,100 soldiers and civil servants who were responsible for the conceptual development of the Army, as well as its training and equipment. In addition the Army Office was responsible for the organisational structure of the Army, for issues to do with in-service systems, and for managing logistic support to the Army. Reporting to the Army Office were the Training Schools and Training Centres. The Army Office was subordinate to the General Staff.

After the disbandment of the Army Office and its merger with the Army Forces Command, its premises and large parts of its personnel have been transferred to the new Army Concepts and Capabilities Development Centre (Amt für Heeresentwicklung, AHEntwg), which also inherited the Army Office's Motto.

Department heads

References

External links 
 Inventories of the Federal Archives
 Article on the disbandment of the Army Office

German Army (1956–present)
Commands (military formations) of Germany
Bundeswehr
Rodenkirchen
Military units and formations established in 1956
Military units and formations disestablished in 2013